Bruce Lee: The Man Only I Knew is a 1975 book about martial arts legend Bruce Lee, written by his widow, Linda Lee Cadwell.

Background
The book was written very close to the time of Bruce Lee's death, thus being very close in Cadwell's memories. It is different from the one she wrote many years later.

The book was then the basis for the movie Dragon: The Bruce Lee Story starring Jason Scott Lee (no relation) as Bruce Lee and Lauren Holly as Linda Emery (her maiden name).

At least three printings (April, June, August, 1975) of this book exist by Warner.

References

External links

Bruce Lee The Man Only I Knew archived on the Internet Archive

1978 non-fiction books
American biographies
Biographies about actors
Biographies adapted into films
Works about Bruce Lee